Pawansa is a block of Sambhal district Uttar Pradesh state, India. It belongs to Moradabad Division. It is located 45 km from District Moradabad. 360 km from the State capital,  Lucknow.

References

Cities and towns in Sambhal district
Sambhal district